Ellindalo Bandavaru is a 1980 Indian Kannada-language film, directed by P. Lankesh and produced by M. V. Chandre Gowda. The film stars Vimala Naidu, Suresh Heblikar, Lokesh and Meena Kuttappa. The film has musical score by Vijaya Bhaskar.

Cast

Vimala Naidu
Suresh Heblikar
Lokesh
Meena Kuttappa
Mala
Ninduvalli Ananthamurthy
H. M. Channayya
L S Sudhindra
Gururaja Rao
Dejamma
A. Kamala
Master Mahadeva
Baby Chandrakala
Duggappa
H. K. Ramanath
Nandishwar
Narasimha

Soundtrack
The music was composed by Vijaya Bhaskar.

References

External links
 
 

1980s Kannada-language films
Films scored by Vijaya Bhaskar
Films directed by P. Lankesh